Axinidris hypoclinoides is a species of ant in the genus Axinidris. Described by Santschi in 1919, collected specimens are only known to be from forestry regions in several African countries.

References

Axinidris
Hymenoptera of Africa
Insects described in 1919